Operation B was a name for Czechoslovak military operation aimed against members of Ukrainian Insurgent Army who entered Czechoslovak territory.

Operation
First members of Ukrainian Insurgent Army entered Czechoslovakia on 13  August 1945 near villages Spišská Stará Ves and Medzilaborce. There were reports of other groups attacking robbing villages near border with Poland. Czechoslovakia sent more units to the area that pushed Ukrainian insurgents back to Poland. Czechoslovak units were commanded by Colonel Jan Heřman.

Polish army launched offensive against Ukrainian Insurgent Army in January 1946. Czechoslovakia reacted by sending more units near borders expecting more insurgents trying to enter Czechoslovakia. Ukrainian Insurgent Army became more active near Polish border with Slovakia and more units entered Czechoslovak territory there. In April 1946 units led by Colonel Heřman launched offensive against insurgents pushing them back to Poland. During late 1946 situation in Slovakia became calmer.

During early 1947 insurgents led some raids to Czechoslovak territory and during Summer 1947 launched their largest attack to Czechoslovakia trying to reach western Europe through its territory. Some groups even enterd Moravia and South Bohemia. Bloodiest clash occurred on 5 August 1947 at Partizánská Ľupča which resulted in death of 6 members of Czechoslovak security forces. Czechoslovak units were gradually destroying Ukrainian  insurgents anfd fights  conculed on 17 November 1947 when last forces of Ukrainian Insurgent Army were destroyed.

Members of OUN captured 33 villages in Czechoslovakia.

Popular culture
1951 Czechoslovak film Operation B focuses on Czechoslovaks participating in military operations against Ukrainian Insurgent Army.

1975 episode of Thirty Cases of Major Zeman called Ruby Crosses was inspired by Ukrainian Insurgent Army activities in Czechoslovakia.

The 1978 film Shadows of a Hot Summer focuses on a family taken hostage by Ukrainian Insurgent Army.

The 1984 film Pasáček z doliny depicts members of Ukrainian Insurgent Army who entered Czechoslovakia.

See also
Operation Vistula

References

Conflicts in 1945
Military history of Czechoslovakia
1945 in Czechoslovakia
Ukrainian Insurgent Army